Samuel A. Buckmaster was a prison warden, mayor, and state legislator in Illinois. He served as Speaker of the Illinois House of Representatives. He served in the Illinois House and Illinois Senate.

Governor Richard Yates wrote to him in opposition of a redistricting plan.

The Colonel Samuel Buckmaster House at 514 State Street in Alton, Illinois 1835? is listed on National Register of Historic Places as part of the Christian Hill Historic District.

An act was passed to lease the state penitentiary (Illinois State Prison) to him.

Buckmaster served as mayor of Alton. Nathaniel Buckmaster who also served as a state legislator and warden of the state oenitentiary was his uncle.

He bred cattle.

In 1877 James Shaw (Illinois politician) was elected Speaker of the House over Buckmaster.

See also
Alton Military Prison

References

This draft is in progress as of October 18, 2022.

Speakers of the Illinois House of Representatives

Year of birth missing
Mayors of places in Illinois
Illinois state senators
Members of the Illinois House of Representatives
19th-century American politicians
People from Alton, Illinois
Year of death missing